The Violin Maker of Cremona is a 1909 silent film drama short directed by D. W. Griffith and starring Herbert Prior and Mary Pickford. It was produced and distributed by the Biograph Company.

The same story was filmed again in 1910 by Pathe.

Cast
Herbert Prior - Taddeo Ferrari
Mary Pickford - Giannina, Taddeo's Daughter
Owen Moore - Sandro
David Miles - Filippo, the Cripple
Harry Solter - The Judge
Marion Leonard - The Judge's Companion

Uncredited:
Charles Avery - Worker
Clara T. Bracey
John R. Cumpson
Arthur V. Johnson
Violet Mersereau
Anthony O'Sullivan
Mack Sennett

References

External links
 The Violin Maker of Cremona at IMDb.com
The Violin Maker of Cremona available for free download at Internet Archive

1909 films
Films directed by D. W. Griffith
Biograph Company films
1909 drama films
American black-and-white films
1900s American films